Caroline Garcia was the defending champion, but she lost in the third round to Aryna Sabalenka.

World No. 2 Caroline Wozniacki won the title, defeating Anastasija Sevastova in the final, 6–3, 6–3. This was Wozniacki's 30th and final WTA tour title, before her retirement in January 2020.

Seeds

The four Wuhan semifinalists received a bye into the second round. They were as follows:
 Ashleigh Barty
  Anett Kontaveit
  Aryna Sabalenka
  Wang Qiang

Draw

Finals

Top half

Section 1

Section 2

Bottom half

Section 3

Section 4

Qualifying

Seeds

Qualifiers

Lucky losers

Draw

First qualifier

Second qualifier

Third qualifier

Fourth qualifier

Fifth qualifier

Sixth qualifier

Seventh qualifier

Eighth qualifier

External links
 Main Draw
 Qualifying Draw

China Open - Women's Singles
China Open - Women's Singles